Kevin Beardmore (21 June 1960 – 14 November 2022) was an English professional rugby league footballer who played in the 1970s, 1980s and 1990s.

Background
Beardmore was born on 21 June 1960. His birth was registered in Pontefract district, West Riding of Yorkshire, England.

Playing career

International honours
Kevin Beardmore won a cap for England while at Castleford in 1984 against Wales, and won caps for Great Britain while at Castleford in 1984 against New Zealand (sub), in 1987 against France (2 matches), in 1988 against France (2 matches), Papua New Guinea, France (2 matches), and New Zealand, in 1989 against France (2 matches), and New Zealand, and in 1990 against France (2 matches).

Beardmore was selected to go on the 1988 Great Britain Lions tour of Australasia.

County honours
Kevin Beardmore won caps for Yorkshire while at Castleford, he played  in the 16-10 victory over Lancashire at Wigan's stadium on 16 September 1987, the 24-14 victory over Lancashire at Leeds' stadium on 21 September 1988, and the 56-12 victory over Lancashire at Wigan's stadium on 20 September 1989.

Challenge Cup Final appearances
Kevin Beardmore played  in Castleford's 15-14 victory over Hull Kingston Rovers in the 1986 Challenge Cup Final during the 1985–86 season at Wembley Stadium, London on Saturday 3 May 1986.

County Cup Final appearances
Kevin Beardmore played  in Castleford's 18-22 defeat by Hull Kingston Rovers in the 1986 Yorkshire County Cup Final during the 1986–87 season at Headingley Rugby Stadium, Leeds on Sunday 27 October 1985, played , scored 2-tries, and was man of the match winning the White Rose Trophy in the 31-24 victory over Hull F.C. in the 1986 Yorkshire County Cup Final during the 1986–87 season at Headingley Rugby Stadium, Leeds on Saturday 11 October 1986, played  in the 12-12 draw with Bradford Northern in the 1987 Yorkshire County Cup Final during the 1987–88 season at Headingley Rugby Stadium, Leeds on Saturday 17 October 1987, did not play (Kenny Hill playing ) in the 2-11 defeat by Bradford Northern in the 1987 Yorkshire County Cup Final replay during the 1987–88 season at Elland Road, Leeds on Saturday 31 October 1987, and played  in the 12-33 defeat by Leeds in the 1988 Yorkshire County Cup Final during the 1988–89 season at Elland Road, Leeds on Sunday 16 October 1988.

Testimonial match
Kevin Beardmore's Testimonial match at Castleford took place in 1988.

Honoured at Castleford Tigers
Kevin Beardmore is a Tigers Hall Of Fame Inductee.

Personal life and death
Kevin Beardmore was the twin brother of the rugby league footballer, Bob Beardmore, and the younger brother of Kenneth Beardmore, and Janet Beardmore.

Beardmore died on 14 November 2022, at the age of 62.

References

External links

Photograph "Castleford hooker Kevin Beardmore takes a knock at Headingley" at wakefieldmuseumcollections.org.uk

1960 births
2022 deaths
Canberra Raiders players
Castleford Tigers players
England national rugby league team players
English rugby league players
Great Britain national rugby league team players
Rugby league hookers
Rugby league players from Pontefract
Rugby league props
Twin sportspeople
English twins
Yorkshire rugby league team players